Niharika Acharya is a journalist who has worked with Voice of America and Semafor,

References

American television news anchors
American radio journalists
Jamia Millia Islamia alumni
Year of birth missing (living people)
Living people
Lady Shri Ram College alumni
Indian emigrants to the United States
American writers of Indian descent
American women television journalists
American women radio journalists
21st-century American women